The Goodbye Girl is a 1977 American romantic comedy-drama film directed by Herbert Ross, written by Neil Simon and starring Richard Dreyfuss, Marsha Mason, Quinn Cummings and Paul Benedict. The film, produced by Ray Stark, centers on an odd trio of characters: a struggling actor who has sublet a Manhattan apartment from a friend, the current occupant (his friend's ex-girlfriend, who has just been abandoned), and her precocious young daughter.

Richard Dreyfuss won the 1977 Academy Award for Best Actor for his performance as Elliot Garfield. At the time, he became the youngest man (at age 30) to win an Oscar for Best Actor. Both Mason and Cummings were nominated for Oscars.

The film became the first romantic comedy to earn $100 million in box-office grosses.

Plot
Dancer and divorcee Paula McFadden (Marsha Mason) and her ten-year-old daughter Lucy (Quinn Cummings) live in a Manhattan apartment with her married boyfriend, Tony DeForrest. Coming home from shopping, Paula finds Tony gone as he had suddenly deserted her to travel to Italy for a film role. Prior to his departure (and unbeknownst to Paula), Tony sublet the apartment to Elliot Garfield (Richard Dreyfuss), a neurotic but sweet aspiring actor from Chicago, who shows up in the middle of the night expecting to move in. Paula, who is demanding, cynical, and neurotic, makes it clear from the start that she does not like Elliot, but reluctantly lets him move in. They argue about boundaries, with Elliot agreeing to allow Paula and Lucy to stay.

Paula is struggling to get back into shape so she can resume her career as a dancer. Meanwhile, Elliot has landed the title role in an off-off-Broadway production of Richard III, but the director, Mark (Paul Benedict), wants him to play the character as an exaggerated homosexual stereotype—in Mark's words, "the queen who wanted to be king." Reluctantly, Elliot agrees to the non-traditional portrayal, despite knowing that it may mean the end of his acting career. Theater critics from numerous New York City television stations and newspapers attend opening night and savage the show, paying special attention to trashing Elliot's performance. The play quickly closes, much to his relief.

Despite their frequent clashes and Paula's lack of gratitude for Elliot's help, the two fall in love and sleep together. Lucy, despite liking Elliot, grows cautious and sees the affair as a repeat of what happened with Tony. Elliot convinces Paula that he will not be a repeat of their experience with Tony; later he picks up Lucy from school and takes her on a carriage ride, during which the youngster admits she likes Elliot. In response, Elliot explains how much he cares for Lucy and Paula and that he would not do anything to hurt them.

Elliot lands a job at an improvisational theatre, and is soon seen by a well-known film director. He is offered an opportunity for a film role that he cannot turn down, but the job is in Seattle and Elliot will be gone for four weeks. Paula is scared that Elliot is leaving her, never to return, like all the other men in her life. Later, Elliot calls Paula from the phone booth across the street to say his flight was delayed, and at the last minute, he invites Paula to go with him while he is filming, suggesting Lucy stay with Paula's friend Donna until they return. Paula declines but is encouraged by Elliot's invitation. Before hanging up, Elliot asks Paula to restring his prized guitar (which he deliberately left at the apartment), and she realizes this proves he really does love her and will indeed return.

Cast
 Richard Dreyfuss as Elliot Garfield
 Marsha Mason as Paula McFadden
 Quinn Cummings as Lucy McFadden
 Paul Benedict as Mark Bodine
 Barbara Rhoades as Donna Douglas
 Theresa Merritt as Mrs. Crosby
 Michael Shawn as Ronnie Burns
 Patricia Pearcy as Rhonda Fontana
 Nicol Williamson as Oliver Fry (uncredited)

Production
The film began as a screenplay called Bogart Slept Here (essentially the story of what happened to Dustin Hoffman after he became a star) that was to star Robert De Niro and Mason for Warner Bros. It would have been the film De Niro made immediately after Taxi Driver. Mike Nichols was hired to direct.

Simon recalled the original idea for the film:

The basic idea of the story was that Marsha, an ex-dancer, was married to a very promising but struggling off-Broadway actor who gets discovered in a small play and is whisked out to Hollywood, where he reluctantly moves with his family. He feels very out of place there...and they have trouble adjusting, especially after his first film makes him an international star...and it creates chaos in their marriage. The story was coming out a little darker than I had imagined, but I envisioned the character of the wife as a very good role for Marsha.

Filming began on Bogart Slept Here but it became apparent that De Niro was not right for the role. Simon recalled: "...it was clear that any of the humor I had written was going to get lost. It's not that De Niro is not funny, but his humor comes mostly from his nuances, a bemused expression on his face or the way he would look at a character, smile and then look up at the ceiling." Nichols insisted on recasting De Niro. Soon after, Nichols left the project.

Dreyfuss was brought in to audition with Mason. At the end of the reading, Simon decided the chemistry was there, but the script needed work. He rewrote the screenplay in six weeks.

[The screenplay] had to be funnier, more romantic, the way Marsha and I first imagined the picture would be. What I wanted to do was a prequel. In other words, instead of an off-Broadway actor, married with a child, why don't I start from the beginning? I'd start when they first meet. Not liking each other at first and then falling in love.

The film's exteriors were filmed in New York City and the interiors were shot on sets in Los Angeles. Warner Bros. was less than enthused about Simon's script and considered selling the project to Metro-Goldwyn-Mayer, but the studio ultimately decided to partner with MGM on the film instead. With the 1996 acquisition of Turner Entertainment Company, which owned the pre-May 1986 MGM film library by Time Warner, Warner Bros. now owns the rights and distribution of the film.

Soundtrack
The title song, "Goodbye Girl", was written and performed by David Gates in 1977, and was a top 20 hit on the Billboard Hot 100 chart in 1977/78, peaking at #15.

Reception
Roger Ebert gave the film a mostly favorable review, awarding three stars out of four. He was unimpressed with Mason's performance and the character as written, calling it "hardly ever sympathetic." However, he praised Dreyfuss and cited his Richard III scenes as "the funniest in a movie since Mel Brooks staged Springtime for Hitler." Ebert criticized the beginning as "awkward at times and never quite involving," but "enjoyed its conclusion so much that we almost forgot our earlier reservations." Gene Siskel awarded an identical three-star grade and said, "Make no mistake about it, the very best thing about 'The Goodbye Girl' is the character of Elliot Garfield as played by Dreyfuss, a character that comes very close to Dreyfuss' own self-and-profession centered lifestyle. But like Dreyfuss himself, Elliott Garfield, who initially comes off as [a] pushy, prickly type, ultimately wins you over." Vincent Canby of The New York Times found the film to be "exhausting without being much fun" and "relentlessly wisecracked." Charles Champlin of The Los Angeles Times lauded it as "the best and most blissfully satisfying romantic comedy of the year and then some." Arthur D. Murphy of Variety called the film "another feather in Herbert Ross' directorial cap," with Dreyfuss giving "his best screen performance to date." Gary Arnold of The Washington Post wrote that the film "evolves into the most satisfying comedy Simon has written directly for the movies. One tolerates the plot mechanics for the sake of the genuinely amusing aspects of his script, the bright remarks and the distinctive or appealing character traits that provide good performers with live ammunition." Pauline Kael of The New Yorker was negative, commenting, "It's not Neil Simon's one-liners that get you down in The Goodbye Girl, it's his two-liners. The snappiness of the exchanges is so forced it's almost macabre." David Ansen of Newsweek wrote, "It's pure formula, and Simon plays it straight, all cards on the table, with the conservative professionalism of a gambler used to winning. As directed by the ubiquitous Herbert Ross, The Goodbye Girl is a modest, bittersweet comedy that will delight Simon fans and leave his critics staunchly unconverted."

Awards and nominations

Richard Dreyfuss was 30 when he won the Academy Award for Best Actor, making him the youngest actor to ever to win the category. This record stood for 25 years until 2002 when Adrien Brody—just one month shy of his 30th birthday—won for The Pianist.

American Film Institute
 AFI's 100 Years...100 Movies – Nominated
 AFI's 100 Years...100 Laughs – Nominated
 AFI's 100 Years...100 Passions – #81
 AFI's 100 Years...100 Songs:
The Goodbye Girl – Nominated
 AFI's 10 Top 10 – Nominated Romantic Comedy

Musical and remake
There were three failed attempts to turn The Goodbye Girl into a half-hour, television sitcom, according to Lee Goldberg's book Unsold Television Pilots. The first pilot, aired on NBC in May 1982 and titled Goodbye Doesn't Mean Forever, starred Karen Valentine and Michael Lembeck, and was directed by James Burrows from a script by Allan Katz. The second, unaired pilot was produced a year later starring JoBeth Williams and was directed by Charlotte Brown from a script by Brown and Pat Nardo. The third pilot, which never aired, again starred Valentine and was directed by Jay Sandrich.

The Goodbye Girl was developed into a 1993 Broadway musical of the same name starring Martin Short and Bernadette Peters.

A 2004 remake with Jeff Daniels and Patricia Heaton keeps the screenplay from the original version.

Home media
The VHS format has been released several times over the years. MGM/UA Home Video released the 1993 and 1996 versions, while Warner Home Video released the 2000 version in addition to releasing the DVD version. A manufacture-on-demand Blu-ray format was released through Warner Archive Collection on November 8, 2016.

In popular culture 
Footage from the film appears in the episode "Kin" on The Last of Us (TV series).

Notes

References

External links

 
 
 
 

1977 films
1977 comedy films
1977 drama films
1970s romantic comedy-drama films
1970s English-language films
1970s American films
American romantic comedy-drama films
Best Musical or Comedy Picture Golden Globe winners
Films about actors
Films directed by Herbert Ross
Films featuring a Best Actor Academy Award-winning performance
Films featuring a Best Musical or Comedy Actor Golden Globe winning performance
Films featuring a Best Musical or Comedy Actress Golden Globe winning performance
Films scored by Dave Grusin
Films set in apartment buildings
Films set in New York City
Films shot in New York City
Films with screenplays by Neil Simon
Metro-Goldwyn-Mayer films
Warner Bros. films